Minuscule 326 (in the Gregory-Aland numbering), α 257 (Soden), is a Greek minuscule manuscript of the New Testament, on parchment. Paleographically it has been assigned to the 10th century. 
Formerly it was labelled by 33a and 39p (Scrivener, Gregory).
It was prepared for liturgical use.

Description 

The codex contains the text of the Acts, Paul on 206 parchment leaves with some lacunae (2 Peter 1:1-16; Romans 1:1-19). The text is written in two columns per page, in 27 lines per page.

It contains Prolegomena, lectionary markings on a margin, Synaxarion, Menologion, subscriptions at the end of each book, numbers of stichoi, and pictures.

The order of books: Acts, General epistles (James, Jude, 1-2 Peter, 1-3 John), Pauline epistles. The order of General epistles is the same as in Minuscule 61.

Text 

The Greek text of the codex is a representative of the Alexandrian text-type, with some alien readings. Aland assigned it to the Category III.

In Acts 1:10.11 the manuscript omits phrase εἰς τὸν οὐρανόν together with the manuscripts Codex Bezae, 33c, and 242.

In Acts 16:10 it reads θεος along with P74, Sinaiticus, Alexandrinus, Vaticanus, Ephraemi, E, 044, 33, 81, 181, 630, 945, 1739, ar, e, l, vg, copbo, geo; other reading κυριος, is supported by D, P, 049, 056, 0142, 88, 104, 330, 436, 451, 614, 629, 1241, 1505, 1877, 2127, 2412, 2492, 2495, Byz, c, d, gig, syrp,h, copsa.

In Acts 20:28 it has Byzantine readings του κυριου και Θεου (of the Lord and God) as the codices P, 049, 1241, 2492 and all the Byzantine manuscripts.

In Acts 27:16 phrase καλουμενον Καυδα is omitted.

In Romans 8:1 it reads Ιησου κατα σαρκα περιπατουσιν αλλα κατα πνευμα, for Ιησου. The reading of the manuscript is supported by אc, Dc, K, P, 33, 88, 104, 181, 330, (436 omit μη), 456, 614, 630, 1241, 1877, 1962, 1984, 1985, 2492, 2495, Byz, Lect.

The text of Romans 16:25-27 is following 14:23, as in Codex Angelicus Codex Athous Lavrensis, 0209, Minuscule 181 330 451 460 614 1241 1877 1881 1984 1985 2492 2495.

In 1 Corinthians 2:1 it reads μαρτυριον along with B D G P Ψ 33 81 104 181 330 451 614 629 630 1241 1739 1877 1881 1962 1984 2127 2492 2495 Byz Lect it vg syrh copsa arm eth. Other manuscripts read μυστηριον or σωτηριον.

In 1 Corinthians 15:54 it has reading το θνητον τουτο ενδυσηασται και το φθαρτον τουτο ενδυσηται αφθαρσιαν και along with Alexandrinus;

In 1 Timothy 3:16 it has textual variant  (God manifested) (Sinaiticuse, A2, C2, Dc, K, L, P, Ψ, 81, 104, 181, 326, 330, 436, 451, 614, 629, 630, 1241, 1739, 1877, 1881, 1962, 1984, 1985, 2492, 2495, Byz, Lect), against ὃς ἐφανερώθη (he was manifested) supported by Sinaiticus, Codex Alexandrinus, Ephraemi, Boernerianus, 33, 365, 442, 2127, ℓ 599.

In 2 Timothy 4:10 it reads Γαλλιαν, along with Sinaiticus C 81 104 436; other manuscript read Γαλατιαν (A D F G K L P Ψ 33 88 181 330 451 614 629 630 1241 1739 1877 1881 1962 1984 1985 2127 2492 2495 Byz Lect) or Γαλιλαιαν (copbo).

In Hebrews 8:11 it reads πλησιον αυτου και εκαστος τον πολιτην for πολιτην.

In 1 John 5:6 it has textual variant δι' ὕδατος καὶ αἵματος καὶ πνεύματος ἁγίου (through water and blood and the Holy Spirit) together with the manuscripts: 61, 1837. Bart D. Ehrman says that this reading is an orthodox corrupt reading.

History 

Robert Flemmyng, Dean of Lincoln, presented the manuscript to Lincoln College in 1483.

Someone collated it for Walton. It was used by John Mill (as Lin. 2). The manuscript was collated by Orlando T. Dobbin in 1854. C. R. Gregory saw it in 1883.

Formerly it was labelled by 33a and 39p. In 1908 Gregory gave the number 326 to it.

The manuscript is currently housed at the Lincoln College (Gr. 82) at Oxford.

See also 

 List of New Testament minuscules
 Biblical manuscript
 Textual criticism

Notes

References

Further reading 

 Orlando T. Dobbin, The Codex Montfortianus (London, 1854).

Greek New Testament minuscules
10th-century biblical manuscripts